Strömgren is a lunar impact crater that is located on the far side of the Moon from the Earth. It lies less than one crater diameter to the north-northeast of Von der Pahlen. Farther to the east is Gerasimovich, and to the north-northeast is Belopol'skiy.

This is a worn and eroded crater formation, with several small craters along the rim edge. The outer rim is not quite circular, with outward bulges to the southeast, southwest, and north-northeast. A small crater is attached to the exterior along the east, and another overlies the inner wall to the northwest. Another small crater lies along the southern rim, and a cluster of small craters lies just outside the southern rim. The interior floor of Strömgren is somewhat uneven, with a low, curved ridge running northward from the southern edge.

Satellite craters
By convention these features are identified on lunar maps by placing the letter on the side of the crater midpoint that is closest to Strömgren.

References

 
 
 
 
 
 
 
 
 
 
 
 

Impact craters on the Moon